An Educational Encyclopedia of Islam is a 2010 encyclopedia written by Islamic scholar Syed Iqbal Zaheer from Bangalore, India and published by Iqra Publishers. He is the editor of the Young Muslim Digest – a monthly Islamic magazine since 1976. He is also the author of several books like Islam: The Religion You Can No Longer Ignore, Fake Pearls: A Collection of Fabricated Prophetic Sayings and Tafsir Ishraq Al-Ma'ani.

This two volume encyclopedia which consists of 1300 pages is covering all the aspects of Islam in dept with graphical illustrations. This encyclopedia has significant notes, four dozen full-scale and unique multi-color maps. Apart from the prophet Muhammad and the earliest Muslims, the encyclopedia also explores the lives of prominent figures from modern Islamic history like Jamaluddin Al-Afghani, Muhammad Iqbal, Syed Abul A’la Mawdudi, Maulana Muhammad Ilyas and Hassan Al-Banna.

This information bank is available on the Internet and can be accessed by universities, students from around the world. “An educational encyclopedia of Islam” is also accessible on apps store. This app was developed on 21 August 2013 by Utrade studios.

References

External links
 
 Educational Encyclopedia of Islam: A Stupendous Task: admirably accomplished.  Dr. A.G. Khan in The Milli Gazette 
 Islamic Encyclopedia Released in Bangalore; Islamic Voice; Bangalore focus  
 Saudi Gazette; Encyclopedia of Islam Launched in Dammam
 Islam.uz
 Kannada.oneindia.com
 Targheeb.com
 Islamic Encyclopedia; Read Online

Encyclopedias of Islam
2010 non-fiction books